The 1947 Gent–Wevelgem was the ninth edition of the Gent–Wevelgem cycle race and was held on 30 March 1947. The race started in Ghent and finished in Wevelgem. The race was won by cyclist Maurice Desimpelaere.

General classification

References

Gent–Wevelgem
1947 in road cycling
1947 in Belgian sport
March 1947 sports events in Europe